Akos Farkas (1898–1971) was a Hungarian-born cinematographer who worked in a number of different countries including Germany, the Netherlands, Italy, Canada and the United States. He worked on more than thirty films during his career including Frederic Zelnik's The Forester's Daughter (1931) Because of his Jewish heritage, Farkas had to leave Germany following the Nazi takeover in 1933.

Selected filmography
 The Third Watch (1924)
 The Bohemian Dancer (1926)
 Five Anxious Days (1928)
 The President (1928)
 On the Reeperbahn at Half Past Midnight (1929)
 Only on the Rhine  (1930)
 Marriage Strike (1930)
 Road to Rio (1931)
 Salto Mortale (1931)
 The Forester's Daughter (1931)
 Willem van Oranje (1934)
 Pygmalion (1937)
 The Three Wishes (1937)
 Star of the Sea (1938)
 All of Life in One Night (1938)
 I Want to Live with Letizia (1938)

References

Bibliography 
 Klossner, Michael. The Europe of 1500-1815 on Film and Television.  McFarland & Co., 2002. 
 Prawer, S.S. Between Two Worlds: The Jewish Presence in German and Austrian Film, 1910-1933. Berghahn Books, 2005.

External links 
 

1898 births
1971 deaths
Hungarian cinematographers
Hungarian Jews
Jewish emigrants from Nazi Germany to the United States